Herbert Hübner (6 February 1889 – 27 January 1972) was a German stage and film actor. He appeared in more than 150 films between 1921 and 1966. He was born in Breslau, Germany (now Wrocław, Poland) and died in Munich, Germany.

Selected filmography

 Storm in a Water Glass (1931)
 The Prince of Arcadia (1932)
 Ripening Youth (1933)
 A Precocious Girl (1934)
 Tales from the Vienna Woods (1934)
 A Star Fell from Heaven (1934)
 Asew (1935)
 The Cossack and the Nightingale (1935)
 The Court Concert (1936)
 The Czar's Courier (1936)
 The Dreamer (1936)
 Savoy Hotel 217 (1936)
 The Accusing Song (1936)
 Family Parade (1936)
 Romance (1936)
 Victoria in Dover (1936)
 Alarm in Peking (1937)
 To New Shores (1937)
 The Ruler (1937)
 Dangerous Game (1937)
 Red Orchids (1938)
The Secret Lie (1938)
 Travelling People (1938)
 We Danced Around the World (1939)
 Hotel Sacher (1939)
  Who's Kissing Madeleine? (1939)
 Robert and Bertram (1939)
 Commissioner Eyck (1940)
 A Man Astray (1940)
 Riding for Germany (1941)
 Goodbye, Franziska (1941)
 Carl Peters (1941)
 The Great King (1942)
 Andreas Schlüter (1942)
 Back Then (1943)
 The War of the Oxen (1943)
 Paracelsus (1943)
 Wild Bird (1943)
 Vienna 1910 (1943)
 Circus Renz (1943)
 Heaven, We Inherit a Castle (1943)
 The Endless Road (1943)
 The Roedern Affair (1944)
 1-2-3 Corona (1948)
 Blum Affair (1948)
 Thank You, I'm Fine (1948)
 The Blue Swords (1949)
 The Appeal to Conscience (1949)
 Kissing Is No Sin (1950)
 A Day Will Come (1950)
 The Guilt of Doctor Homma (1951)
 I Lost My Heart in Heidelberg (1952)
 The Sergeant's Daughter (1952)
 Illusion in a Minor Key (1952)
 Stars Over Colombo (1953)
 Christina (1953)
  Father Is Being Stupid (1953)
 Prosecutor Corda (1953)
 Conchita and the Engineer (1954)
 The Little Town Will Go to Sleep (1954)
  The Seven Dresses of Katrin (1954)
 The Country Schoolmaster (1954)
 The Ambassador's Wife (1955)
 Your Life Guards (1955)
 Ludwig II (1955)
 One Woman Is Not Enough? (1955)
 Royal Hunt in Ischl (1955)
 A Thousand Melodies (1956)
 My Sixteen Sons (1956)
 Regine (1956)
 San Salvatore (1956)
 The Mad Bomberg (1957)
 The Spessart Inn (1958)
 The Copper (1958)
  Mandolins and Moonlight (1959)
 The Haunted Castle (1960)
 Isola Bella (1961)

References

External links

1889 births
1972 deaths
German male film actors
German male stage actors
German male silent film actors
Actors from Wrocław
20th-century German male actors
People from the Province of Silesia